Vincent Dennehy Aloysius McCarten (9 April 1913 – 28 July 1993) was a New Zealand cricketer. He was a right-handed batsman and wicket-keeper who played for Otago. He was born in Dunedin and died in Christchurch.

McCarten made a single first-class appearance for the team, during the 1944–45 season, against Canterbury. From the middle order, he scored 3 runs in the first innings in which he batted, and a duck in the second, as the team lost the match by an innings margin.

See also
 List of Otago representative cricketers

External links
Vincent McCarten at Cricket Archive 

1913 births
1993 deaths
New Zealand cricketers
Otago cricketers